Leccinum brunneum is a species of bolete fungus in the family Boletaceae. Found in the Sierra Nevada region of California, it was described as new to science in 1971 by mycologist Harry Delbert Thiers.

See also
List of Leccinum species
List of North American boletes

References

Fungi described in 1971
Fungi of California
brunneum
Fungi without expected TNC conservation status